Tropicultura is a peer-reviewed open access scholarly journal publishing original articles, research and summary notes, overviews of books and essays, announcements and reports on films / audio-visual resources concerning all fields linked to rural development, as well as sustainable management of the environment in overseas countries. It is published on the Portail de Publication de Périodiques Scientifiques (PoPuPS) platform operated by the University of Liège Library. The current editor-in-chief is J. Bogaert.

Abstracting and indexing 
The journal is abstracted and indexed in:

References

External links 
 

Open access journals
Publications established in 1983
English-language journals
Agricultural journals
1983 establishments in Belgium